The Flora of Colombia is characterized by over 28,000 species of green plants.

National Flower of Colombia

The national flower of Colombia is the orchid Cattleya trianae which was named after the Colombian naturalist José Jerónimo Triana. The orchid was selected by botanist Emilio Robledo, in representation of the Colombian Academy of History to determine the most representative flowering plant of Colombia. He described it as one of the most beautiful flowers in the world and selected Cattleya trianae as National symbol.

National Tree of Colombia

The national tree of Colombia is the palm Ceroxylon quindiuense (Quindío wax palm) which was named after the Colombian Department of Quindío where is located the Cocora valley, the only habitat of this restricted range species.  The Quindío wax palm was selected as the national tree by the government of Belisario Betancur and was the first tree officially declared as a protected species in Colombia. C.quindiuense is the only palm that grows at such high altitudes in Colombia and is the tallest monocot in the world.

Endemism

Colombia has the largest number of endemic species (species that are not found naturally anywhere else) worldwide. About 10% of the species in the world live in Colombia.  Some determinant factors in the distribution range of the species are the wide diversity of habitats available due to the variety of altitudes, weather conditions, temperatures, soils and sunlight on the coasts, in the Andes and in the rainforest lowlands.

Endemics can easily become endangered or extinct due to their restricted habitat and vulnerability to the actions of man, including the introduction of new organisms.

Ecoregions with high endemism

According to the Colombian Ministry of Environment, the following ecoregions have the highest percentage of botanic endemic species:

 Colombian Amazon basin
 Catatumbo River basin
 Mid Magdalena river basin
 Pacific coastal region

Tree species
Many of the Colombian trees are endangered species due to the high quality of the woods and timber industry exploitation (such as Colombian oak Quercus humboldtidiana and Colombian mahogany) and as source of tanning substances for the leather industry (such as mangrove and Encenillo tree Weinmannia tomentosa).
Some tree species described in Colombia are:

Anadenanthera peregrina
Amazon Grape
Adenolisianthus arboreus
Aiouea angulata
Anthodiscus montanus
Astrocaryum triandrum
Attalea septuagenata
Bactris coloniata
Banara ibaguensis
Blakea granatensis
Bonnetia holostyla
Bulnesia carrapo
Brazil Nut
Borojoa patinoi
Caryocar nuciferum
Caryodaphnopsis cogolloi
Casearia megacarpa
Coccothrinax argentata
Cryosophila kalbreyeri
Cyathea incana
Cyrilla racemiflora 
Chelyocarpus dianeurus
Cherimoya
Dendropanax colombianus
Esenbeckia alata
Feijoa
Guaiacum officinale
Garcia nutans
Gonolobus condurango
Graffenrieda grandifolia
Hirtella enneandra
Huberodendron patinoi
Hampea thespesioides
Henriettella goudotiana
Humiriastrum melanocarpum
Itaya amicorum
Macrosamanea consanguinea
Neosprucea sararensis
Platonia insignis
Quararibea asterolepis
Quararibea cordata
Ouratea tumacoensis
Reinhardtia ssp.
Simaba cedron
Syagrus smithii
Tessmannianthus quadridomius
Trigonobalanus excelsa

Fruits of Colombia

Genera

Abarema
Abarema callejasii
Abarema ganymedea
Abarema josephi
Abarema killipii
Abarema lehmannii

Acidocroton
Acidocroton gentryi

Aiphanes
Aiphanes acaulis
Aiphanes duquei
Aiphanes leiostachys
Aiphanes lindeniana
Aiphanes linearis

Aniba
Aniba novo-granatensis
Aniba rosaeodora
Aniba vaupesiana

Brownea
Brownea santanderensis
Browneopsis excelsa

Brunellia
Brunellia almaguerensis
Brunellia antioquensis
Brunellia boqueronensis
Brunellia elliptica
Brunellia farallonensis
Brunellia macrophylla
Brunellia occidentalis
Brunellia penderiscana
Brunellia racemifera
Brunellia rufa
Brunellia subsessilis

Calatola
Calatola columbiana

Centronia
Centronia brachycera
Centronia mutisii

Ceroxylon
Ceroxylon alpinum
Ceroxylon ferrugineum
Ceroxylon quindiuense
Ceroxylon sasaimae

Clusia
Clusia croatii
Clusia osseocarpa

Eschweilera
Eschweilera bogotensis
Eschweilera boltenii
Eschweilera integricalyx
Eschweilera integrifolia
Eschweilera pittieri
Eschweilera punctata
Eschweilera rimbachii
Eschweilera sclerophylla

Espeletia

Freziera
Freziera echinata
Freziera euryoides
Freziera jaramilloi
Freziera longipes
Freziera punctata
Freziera retinveria
Freziera sessiliflora
Freziera smithiana
Freziera stuebelii
Freziera velutina

Grias
Grias colombiana
Grias haughtii
Grias multinervia

Guarea
Guarea caulobotrys
Guarea corrugata

Gustavia
Gustavia excelsa
Gustavia foliosa
Gustavia gracillima
Gustavia latifolia
Gustavia longifuniculata
Gustavia monocaulis
Gustavia petiolata
Gustavia pubescens
Gustavia santanderiensis
Gustavia sessilis
Gustavia verticillata

Herrania
Herrania laciniifolia
Herrania umbratica

Huilaea
Huilaea kirkbridei
Huilaea macrocarpa
Huilaea minor
Huilaea mutisiana
Huilaea occidentalis
Huilaea penduliflora

Inga
Inga allenii
Inga coragypsea
Inga goniocalyx
Inga interfluminensis
Inga macarenensis
Inga mucuna
Inga saffordiana

Leptolejeunea
Leptolejeunea tridentata

Licania
Licania salicifolia

Macrolobium
Macrolobium pittieri

Magnolia
Magnolia calimaensis
Magnolia calophylla
Magnolia cararensis
Magnolia caricifragrans
Magnolia cespedesii
Magnolia colombiana
Magnolia espinalii
Magnolia georgii
Magnolia gilbertoi
Magnolia guatapensis
Magnolia henaoi
Magnolia hernandezii
Magnolia katiorum
Magnolia lenticellata
Magnolia mahechae
Magnolia narinensis
Magnolia polyhypsophylla
Magnolia santanderiana
Magnolia urraoense
Magnolia virolinensis
Magnolia wolfii
Magnolia yarumalense

Mayna
Mayna pubescens
Mayna suaveolens

Meriania
Meriania peltata
Meriania versicolor

Metteniusa
Metteniusa cundinamarcensis
Metteniusa edulis
Metteniusa huilensis
Metteniusa santanderensis

Miconia
Miconia poecilantha

Oenocarpus
Oenocarpus circumtextus
Oenocarpus makeru
Oenocarpus simplex

Orphanodendron
Orphanodendron bernalii

Parmentiera
Parmentiera stenocarpa

Passiflora
Passiflora tarminiana

Phytelephas
Phytelephas seemannii
Phytelephas tumacana

Pouteria
Pouteria arguacoensium
Pouteria bracteata
Pouteria chocoensis
Pouteria espinae

Pradosia
Pradosia cuatrecasasii

Prunus
Prunus buxifolia
Prunus guanaiensis
Prunus huantensis
Prunus integrifolia
Prunus littlei
Prunus subcorymbosa
Prunus villegasiana, synonym of Prunus integrifolia

Rinorea
Rinorea antioquiensis
Rinorea cordata
Rinorea haughtii
Rinorea hymenosepala
Rinorea laurifolia
Rinorea marginata
Rinorea ulmifolia

Rollinia
Rollinia amazonica
Rollinia pachyantha
Rollinia rufinervis

Romeroa
Romeroa verticillata

Schoenocephalium
Inírida flower

Solanum
Solanum sibundoyense
Solanum betaceum (tamarillo)

Sphaerolejeunea
Sphaerolejeunea umbilicata

Streptosolen
Streptosolen jamesonii

Swartzia
Swartzia macrophylla
Swartzia oraria
Swartzia robiniifolia
Swartzia santanderensis

Utricularia
Utricularia neottioides
Utricularia nervosa
Utricularia oliveriana
Utricularia pusilla
Utricularia triloba

Vantanea
Vantanea magdalenensis

Wettinia
Wettinia anomala
Wettinia disticha
Wettinia fascicularis
Wettinia hirsuta
Wettinia kalbreyeri

Xylosma
Xylosma obovata

Zamia
Zamia amplifolia
Zamia encephalartoides
Zamia montana
Zamia wallisii

Zygia
Zygia lehmannii

Orchid species
Colombia has the largest number of orchids in the world.  Among others:

Frondaria
Frondaria caulescens

Restrepia
Restrepia antennifera
Restrepia chocoensis
Restrepia citrina
Restrepia muscifera

See also
Fauna of Colombia
List of national parks of Colombia
Environmental issues in Colombia

References